This is a list of election results for the electoral district of Alexandra in South Australian elections.

Members for Alexandra

Election results

Elections in the 1990s

Elections in the 1980s

Elections in the 1970s

The two candidate preferred vote was not counted between the Liberal and Liberal Movement candidates for Alexandra.

Elections in the 1960s

Elections in the 1950s

Elections in the 1940s

 Preferences were not distributed.

Elections in the 1930s

References

South Australian state electoral results by district